The National Cherry Blossom Festival is a spring celebration in Washington, D.C., commemorating the March 27, 1912, gift of Japanese cherry trees from Mayor Yukio Ozaki of Tokyo City to the city of Washington, D.C. Ozaki gave the trees to enhance the growing friendship between the United States and Japan and also celebrate the continued close relationship between the two nations. Large and colorful helium balloons, floats, marching bands from across the country, music and showmanship are parts of the Festival's parade and other events.

History of the cherry trees

Early initiatives

The effort to bring cherry blossom trees to Washington, D.C., preceded the official planting by several decades. In 1885, Eliza Ruhamah Scidmore returned from her first trip to Japan and approached the U.S. Army Superintendent of the Office of Public Buildings and Grounds with the idea of planting cherry trees along the reclaimed waterfront of the Potomac River. Scidmore, who would go on to become the first female board member of the National Geographic Society, was rebuffed, though she would continue proposing the idea to every Superintendent for the next 24 years. Several cherry trees were brought to the region by individuals in this period, including one that was the location of a 1905 cherry blossom viewing and tea party hosted by Scidmore in northwest D.C. Among the guests was prominent botanist David Fairchild and his fiancée Marian, the daughter of inventor Alexander Graham Bell.

In 1906, David Fairchild imported 1000 cherry trees from the Yokohama Nursery Company in Japan and planted them on his own property in Chevy Chase, Maryland.  The Fairchilds were pleased with the results of their planting and in 1907 began promoting Japanese flowering cherry trees as an ideal tree to plant around avenues in the Washington area.  On September 26, with the help of the Fairchilds' friends, the Chevy Chase Land Company ordered 300 Oriental cherry trees for the Chevy Chase area. In 1908, Fairchild donated cherry saplings to every D.C. school to plant on its school grounds in observance of Arbor Day.  At an Arbor Day speech that Eliza Scidmore attended, Fairchild proposed that the "Speedway" (a now non-existing route around the D.C. Tidal Basin) be turned into a "Field of Cherries".

In 1909, Scidmore decided to raise the money to buy cherry trees and donate them to the District.  As a matter largely of form, on April 5 she wrote a letter to First Lady Helen Herron Taft, wife of newly elected President Taft, informing her of her plans.  Two days later, the First Lady responded:

By chance, Jōkichi Takamine, the Japanese chemist who discovered adrenaline, was in Washington with Mr. Midzuno, the Japanese consul to New York City, on April 8.  Informed of a plan to plant Japanese cherry trees along the Speedway (Ohio Avenue), Takamine asked if Mrs. Taft would accept an additional 2000 trees, while Midzuno suggested that the trees be given in the name of Tokyo.  Takamine and Midzuno subsequently met with the First Lady, who accepted the offer of 2000 trees.

On April 13, Spencer Cosby, Superintendent of the Office of Public Buildings and Grounds, purchased ninety cherry trees (Prunus serrulata) that were planted along the Potomac River from the Lincoln Memorial south toward East Potomac Park.  It was subsequently discovered that the trees were of the cultivar Shirofugen, rather than the ordered Fugenzo.  These trees had largely disappeared by the 21st century.

On August 30, 1909, the Embassy of Japan in Washington, D.C., informed the U.S. Department of State that the city of Tokyo intended to donate 2000 cherry trees to the United States to be planted along the Potomac. These trees arrived in Washington, D.C., on January 6, 1910. However, the inspection team from the Department of Agriculture (led by Flora Wambaugh Patterson) found that the trees were infested with insects and nematodes, concluding that the trees had to be destroyed to protect local growers. President Taft gave the order to burn the trees on January 28. Secretary of State Philander C. Knox wrote a letter expressing the regret of all involved to the Japanese Ambassador. Takamine responded to the news with another donation for more trees, 3020 in all, of a lineage taken from a famous group of trees along the Arakawa River in Tokyo and grafted onto stock from Itami, Hyogo Prefecture. On February 14, 1912, 3020 cherry trees of twelve cultivars were shipped on board the Awa Maru and arrived in D.C. via rail car from Seattle on March 26.

Much of the behind-the-scenes diplomatic events linked to the Japanese giving of the cherry blossom trees to Washington, D.C., in 1912 are relatively unknown, according to the March 26, 2010, Washington Post article "Scenes from 2010's Cherry Blossom Festival, an annual rite of spring in Washington." By Michael E. Ruane Washington Post Staff Writer. The Art of Peace illustrated biography on Prince Iyesato Tokugawa presents much of this prior history and the behind-the-scenes political details surrounding this Japanese goodwill gesture which point strongly to Prince Tokugawa's pivotal role in the initial Japanese gifting and its evolution into the National Cherry Blossom Festival in 1935. But instead of taking credit, Prince Tokugawa  humbly wished to have this gift be seen coming directly from Japan's capital city Tokyo to the U.S. capital city Washington, D.C., without himself getting any recognition for this international goodwill gesture. Prince Iyesato Tokugawa (1863-1940) held great influence based on his being both the heir to the last Shogun of Japan, Tokugawa Yoshinobu, a dynasty that ruled for over 260 years, and also based on Prince Tokugawa holding the powerful position of President of Japan's upper house of congress the House of Peers for thirty years (1903-1933).

The 1910 New York Daily Tribune newspaper announced the upcoming arrival of Prince Tokugawa to New York City, after he had just visited Washington, D.C. This article mentioned that scheduled to coincide with the visit of Prince Tokugawa to New York City, was the recent arrival of a delegation of sixty Japanese. Prince Tokugawa and this Japanese delegation had all spent time together in Washington, D.C., prior to their visiting New York City. While in Washington, D.C., Prince Tokugawa met and dined with President William Howard Taft at the White House, who was honoring his visit. To understand the comradery already established between Prince Tokugawa and President Taft, one needs to recognize that from 1901 to 1908, while serving under President Theodore Roosevelt, the then Secretary of War William Howard Taft traveled around the world, including voyages to Japan where he was hosted and met with Prince Tokugawa. Taft was being groomed for his future role as President.

While in Washington, D.C., during his 1910 visit, the 37-year-old Prince Tokugawa twice visited the U.S. Senate to see first-hand the American legislative process. Tokugawa wished to familiarize himself with the similarities and differences between various democracies, such as that of the United States and Britain, to that of his own nation, Japan. One of the Japanese delegates who was part of Prince Tokugawa's delegation, who is shown in the 1910 Daily Tribune newspaper article photo illustration was the Mayor of Tokyo Yukio Ozaki, the Japanese official most remembered being linked to the Japanese gift of cherry blossom trees. This 1910 news article also stated that as part of Prince Tokugawa's visit to New York City, Prince Tokugawa expressed his desire to see the immense development that had occurred in the United States since his last visit. Prince Tokugawa and five of his Japanese companions toured the city; this included a visit to the American Stock Exchange on Wall Street; they also marveled at the construction of the Holland Tunnel. Prince Tokugawa was also invited to a small private dinner in honor of his visit to New York City, given by Kokichi Midzuno, Consul General of Japan. (Midzuno is the Japanese official who first contacted Japan's central government in 1910, asking for their advice on how best to proceed with the Japanese gift of cherry trees to Washington, D.C.) Of the eighteen guests at the above dinner, several were prominent leaders from New York City's Japanese-American community. Rather than wishing to receive a recognition for facilitating the Japanese gifting of cherry trees, Prince Iyesato Tokugawa preferred that the gift be seen as a token of goodwill coming directly from Japan and its capital city of Tokyo to the United States and its capital city of Washington, D.C. During his visit to the U.S., Tokugawa introduced the mayor of Tokyo to many influential Japanese Americans and to U.S. officials, so as to promote this Japanese gift, which in coming decades would be commemorated and grow into one of Washington, D.C.'s largest celebrations.

During his long career, Prince Tokugawa creatively promoted a friendship and alliance with six U.S. presidents and other world leaders during his extensive travels abroad. He was in many ways the diplomatic face of Japan when it came to international relations during the first 40 years of the twentieth century. Those years were often politically and socially turbulent, requiring Prince Tokugawa to take a leading role in encouraging respectful international diplomacy and military arms limitation at the Washington Naval Arms Conference. He strongly promoted an appreciation for democracy and during the 1920s took a leading stance against racism by introducing Abraham Lincoln's principles of equality into all of Japan's public schools and universities through Lincoln essay writing contests, where the winning students were given bronze commemorative coins with the face of President Lincoln.

One of Prince Tokugawa's closest and most influential Japanese allies was Baron Shibusawa Eiichi (aka Baron Eiichi Shibusawa). The combination of the 1915 and 1937 illustrations to the right offer a new window to Prince Tokugawa and Baron Shibusawa and their allies' significant influence linked to the initial cherry blossom tree giving and its evolution into the annual National Cherry Blossom Festival. The 1915 illustration is a rare photo that was discovered while doing research for the illustrated biography The Art of Peace. This biography highlights the alliance of Prince Tokugawa and Baron Shibusawa as they strove to promote international goodwill. This 1915 photo illustration (which is a section of a larger photograph) presents Baron Shibusawa Eiichi standing between two of his prominent Japanese colleagues. Shibusawa had been sitting at the other end of the huge banquet table, near former President Theodore Roosevelt, but for the sake of shooting and capturing this group photo of sixty attendees, the photographer requested that Shibusawa come to the other side of the table to be closer to former President William Howard Taft (who is at the far right in the photo, seated next to the gentleman whose image reveals only one half of his face). Standing at Shibusawa's right side is the Japanese-American Dr. Jōkichi Takamine, one of the two individuals who hosted this diplomatic banquet event. Dr. Takamine was a highly successful and respected chemist and businessman who helped found an international pharmaceutical company that continues to this day. Takamine was the individual who first offered to pay for the cherry blossom trees that were to be given by Japan to Washington, D.C. In this 1915 photo, standing at Shibusawa's left side is Count Chinda Sutemi, Japanese Ambassador to the United States. Both Dr. Takamine and Ambassador Sutemi were closely linked to the giving of cherry blossom trees to Washington, D.C.

Japanese gift planted
In a ceremony on March 27, 1912, First Lady Helen Herron Taft and Viscountess Chinda, wife of the Japanese ambassador, planted the first two of these trees on the north bank of the Tidal Basin in West Potomac Park. At the end of the ceremony, the First Lady presented Viscountess Chinda with a bouquet of 'American Beauty' roses. These two trees still stand at the terminus of 17th Street Southwest, marked by a large plaque. By 1915, the United States government had responded with a gift of flowering dogwood trees to the people of Japan.

To further build on the growing goodwill between Japan and the U.S. based on the giving of the Cherry Blossom Trees in 1912, one of Prince Iyesato Tokugawa's close friends and political allies, Baron Eiichi Shibusawa, visited the U.S. in 1915. The 1915 photo illustration presented to the right presents Shibusawa attending a large banquet in New York City that was held in his honor. The host of this banquet is Dr. Jōkichi Takamine, the successful Japanese-American community activist and businessman who first offered to purchase the cherry blossom trees and have this gift diplomatically come from the nation of Japan. Former President William Howard Taft is also in attendance at this event showing respect for Baron Shibusawa. It was President Taft and his wife who officially received the gift of the cherry blossom trees from the representatives of Japan three years earlier.

From 1913 to 1920, trees of the Somei-Yoshino variety, which comprised 1800 of the gift, were planted around the Tidal Basin. Trees of the other 11 cultivars, and the remaining Yoshinos, were planted in East Potomac Park. In 1927, a group of American school children re-enacted the initial planting. This event is recognized as the first D.C. cherry blossom festival. In 1934, the District of Columbia Commissioners sponsored a three-day celebration of the flowering cherry trees.

National annual event

The first "Cherry Blossom Festival" was held in late 1934 under joint sponsorship by numerous civic groups, and in 1935 it officially became a national annual event. The cherry trees had by this point become an established part of the nation's capital. In 1938, plans to cut down trees to clear ground for the Jefferson Memorial prompted a group of women to chain themselves together at the site in protest. A compromise was reached where more trees would be planted along the south side of the Basin to frame the Memorial. A Cherry Blossom Pageant was begun in 1940.

In 1937, the Garden Club of America commemorated the 25th Anniversary of the Japanese gift of cherry blossom trees to the U.S., by giving 5,000 flowering trees and plants to Japan. Who better to receive this U.S. goodwill gift than Prince Tokugawa, who had played a pivotal role behind-the-scenes and had introduced the then Mayor of Tokyo Ozaki to the U.S. leaders in Washington, D.C., in 1910, as part of the giving of those cherry blossom trees. It is revealing that in 1937, Prince Tokugawa accompanied by the current Mayor of Tokyo are now the representatives of Japan in receiving this gift from the Garden Club of America at a ceremony held at Kiyozumi Park, Tokyo.

On December 11, 1941, four trees were cut down. It is suspected that this was retaliation for the attack on Pearl Harbor by the Empire of Japan four days earlier, though this was never confirmed. In hopes of dissuading people from further attacks upon the trees during the war, they were referred to as "Oriental" flowering cherry trees for the war's duration.  Suspended during World War II, the festival resumed in 1947 with the support of the Washington, D.C., Board of Trade and the D.C. Commissioners.

In 1948, the Cherry Blossom Princess and U.S. Cherry Blossom Queen program were started by the National Conference of State Societies. A Princess was selected from each state and federal territory, with a queen chosen to reign over the festival. In 1952, Japan requested help restoring the cherry tree grove at Adachi, Tokyo, along the Arakawa River, which was the parent stock of the D.C. trees but had diminished during the war. In response, the National Park Service sent budwood back to Tokyo.

The Japanese ambassador gave a 300-year-old stone lantern to the city of Washington to commemorate the signing of the 1854 Japan-US Treaty of Amity and Friendship by Commodore Matthew C. Perry. For a number of years, the lighting of this lantern formally opened the Festival. Three years later, the president of The Pearl Company started by Mikimoto Kōkichi donated the Mikimoto Pearl Crown. The next year, the Mayor of Yokohama gave a stone pagoda to the city to "symbolize the spirit of friendship between the United States of America manifested in the Treaty of Peace, Amity and Commerce signed at Yokohama on March 31, 1854."

The Japanese gave 3,800 more Yoshino trees in 1965, which were accepted by First Lady Lady Bird Johnson. These trees were grown in the United States and many were planted on the grounds of the Washington Monument. For the occasion, the First Lady and Ryuji Takeuchi, wife of the Japanese ambassador, reenacted the 1912 planting. In 1982, Japanese horticulturalists took cuttings from Yoshino trees in Washington, D.C., to replace cherry trees that had been destroyed in a flood in Japan. From 1986 to 1988, 676 cherry trees were planted using US$101,000 in private funds donated to the National Park Service to restore the trees to the number at the time of the original gift.

In 1994, the Festival was expanded to two weeks to accommodate the many activities that happen during the trees' blooming. Two years later, the Potomac and Arakawa became sister rivers. Cuttings were taken from the documented 1912 trees in 1997 to be used in replacement plantings and thus preserve the genetic heritage of the grove. In 1999, fifty trees of the Usuzumi variety from Motosu, Gifu, were planted in West Potomac Park. According to legend, these trees were first planted by Emperor Keitai in the 6th century and were designated a National Treasure of Japan in 1922. From 2002 to 2006, 400 trees propagated from the surviving 1912 trees were planted to ensure the genetic heritage of the original donation is maintained.

Organization and events

The National Cherry Blossom Festival is coordinated by the National Cherry Blossom Festival, Inc., an umbrella organization consisting of representatives of business, civic, and governmental organizations. More than 700,000 people visit Washington each year to admire the blossoming cherry trees that herald the beginning of spring in the nation's capital.

The three-week festival begins around the middle of March with a Family Day at the National Building Museum and an official opening ceremony in the Warner Theatre. The Pink Tie Party is also held, at which attendees are invited to don their finest pink attire to revel together and toast the spring season. An array of activities and cultural events takes place on the following days. The Blossom Kite Festival (formerly the Smithsonian Kite Festival) usually takes place during the festival's first or second weekend. Every day there is a sushi/sake celebration, classes about cherry blossoms, and a bike tour of the Tidal Basin. Other events include art exhibits (photography, sculpture, animation), cultural performances, rakugo, kimono fashion shows, dance, singing, martial arts, merchant-sponsored events, and a rugby union tournament.

The next Saturday, a three-stage festival takes place on the Southwest Waterfront. When the festival ends, a fireworks show begins on the nearby Washington Channel. The next morning (Sunday), the Credit Union Cherry Blossom Ten Mile Run begins on the grounds of the Washington Monument. Later that Sunday, dignitaries gather at the Tidal Basin to participate in a ceremonial lighting of the 360-year-old Japanese stone lantern.

During the morning of the festival's last Saturday, the National Cherry Blossom Festival Parade travels along Constitution Avenue from 7th to 17th Streets, NW. For 16 years until 2015, the Sakura Matsuri-Japanese Street Festival, the largest Japanese Cultural Festival in the United States, took place throughout the day along 12th Street and Pennsylvania Avenue, NW, near the route of the parade.  However, the 2016 Street Festival will take place at M Street SE and New Jersey Avenue SE, near the Department of Transportation exit of the Navy Yard-Ballpark Metro station in the distant Capitol Riverfront area. The Street Festival's relocation became necessary when the Trump Organization, which will operate the Trump International Hotel in the Old Post Office Pavilion at 12th Street and Pennsylvania Avenue NW, negotiated a deal with the Government of the District of Columbia that requires a -wide lane on Pennsylvania Avenue to remain open to the hotel's customers and valet parking service except during major events such as presidential inaugural parades, thus leaving insufficient space on the Avenue for the festival's activities.

In 2009, the National Cherry Blossom Festival introduced an alternative event to its lineup, with the debut of Cherry Blast, an underground-ish mix of projected art, dance performances, live music, fashion and DJs that took place in an empty (but festively decorated) Anacostia warehouse. (Most of the crowd was shuttle-bussed in from Dupont Circle.) In 2010, Cherry Blast II—the creation of artist Philippa P. Hughes of the Pink Line Project—moved to a storage warehouse in Adams Morgan, but still featured an eclectic group of local artists and musicians. The 2016 Cherry Blast took place at the Carnegie Library at Mount Vernon Square during the last Saturday evening of the festival.

The event's organizers cancelled many of the events since 2020 because of concerns related the ongoing coronavirus pandemic. Several activities have since been added to engage the community in the springtime celebration, such as Petal Porches,  Art in Bloom, and Paws & Petals.

Types of cherry trees

Of the initial gift of 12 varieties of 3,020 trees, The Yoshino Cherry (70% of total) and Kwanzan Cherry (13% of total) now dominate.

The first 12 cultivars presented were 'Yoshino', 'Kwanzan', 'Ichiyo', 'Taki-nioi', 'Shirayuki', 'Fugenzo', 'Ariake', 'Jo-nioi', 'Fukurokuju', 'Surugadai-nioi', 'Gyoiko', and 'Mikuruma-gaeshi'. With the exception of 'Yoshino', these 11 cultivars belong to the Sato-zakura group, a complex interspecific hybrid derived from the Oshima cherry. Many cultivars other than 'Yoshino' and 'Kwanzan' are not currently available for viewing because they have been transplanted to other cultivars that were presented later.

The Yoshino produces single white blossoms that create an effect of white clouds around the Tidal Basin and north onto the grounds of the Washington Monument. Intermingled with the Yoshino are a small number of Akebono cherry trees, which bloom at the same time as the Yoshino and produce single, pale-pink blossoms.

The Kwanzan grows primarily in East Potomac Park and comes into bloom two weeks after the Yoshino. It produces clusters of clear pink double blossoms. East Potomac Park also has Fugenzo, which produces rosy pink double blossoms, and Shirofugen, which produces white double blossoms that age to pink.

Interspersed among all the trees are the Weeping Cherry, which produces a variety of single and double blossoms of colors ranging from dark pink to white about a week before the Yoshino. Other cultivars and species that can be found are the Autumn Cherry (semi-double, pink), Sargent Cherry (single, deep pink), Usuzumi (white-grey), and Takesimensis (good in wet areas).

Gallery

See also
Branch Brook Park, largest collection of cherry blossom trees in the United States
Hanami, Cherry Blossom Viewing in Japanese
International Cherry Blossom Festival, Macon, Georgia
Canadian Tulip Festival, a festival commemorating a similar gift from the Dutch Royal Family in exile during World War II

References

Further reading
 Ann McClellan, The cherry blossom festival: Sakura celebration (Bunker Hill Publishing, 2005).

External links

 
 Cherry Blossom Festival by the National Park Service
 Guide to the National Cherry Blossom Festival records, 1999-2000, Special Collections Research Center, Estelle and Melvin Gelman Library, The George Washington University.
 Photos of Washington DC's cherry blossoms in bloom
 Video of the 1944 Cherry Blossom Festival
 Washington DC Cherry Blossoms and Blossom Kite Festival
 Sakura Matsuri-Japanese Street Festival
 View The Japanese flowering cherry trees of Washington, D.C. by Roland M. Jefferson online at the Biodiversity Heritage Library.
Cherry Blossom Cam by EarthCam
History of the National Cherry Blossom Festival - The Art of Peace illustrated biography on Prince Tokugawa Iesato

Festivals in Washington, D.C.
Japan–United States relations
Japanese-American culture in Washington, D.C.
Landmarks in Washington, D.C.
March 2020 events in the United States
Spring festivals in the United States
Articles containing video clips
Flower festivals in the United States
Cherry blossom festivals
Annual events in Washington, D.C.